The 1978–79 season was the 41st season in the history of Wigan Athletic F.C. and their first as a professional club in the Football League. After finishing 2nd in the Northern Premier League during the previous season, the club was nominated to apply for Football League status, and were elected into the league to replace Southport. After a poor start, the club exceeded expectations in the league, and towards the end of the season, a second consecutive promotion seemed possible. The club eventually fell short, finishing the season in 6th place with a total of 55 points.

Wigan entered the FA Cup in the first round, but were knocked out by Bury following a replay. The club also entered the League Cup for the first time, winning against Tranmere Rovers before being defeated in the second round by Luton Town. The club's first signing as a member of the Football League was Ian Purdie, who along with Tommy Gore and Jeff Wright, went on to play every league game during the club's first season. Peter Houghton was the team's top goalscorer with a total of 13 league goals (14 in all competitions).

Background
In the 1977–78 season, Wigan competed in the Northern Premier League, and secured a second-place finish in the last game of the season with a 1–0 win against Matlock Town. Under normal circumstances, league winners Boston United would have applied for Football League status, but the League Management Committee had decided that their ground was not up to the required standards. As a result, runners-up Wigan became the Northern Premier League's nomination to apply for Football League status.

At the time, the only way a team could be promoted into the Football League was if their application received more votes than one of the bottom four teams of the Football League in an annual election system. In practice, this process was usually a formality, and very few teams were promoted – Wigan's application to join the league had been rejected on 34 previous occasions. The vote took place on 2 June 1978. In the first poll, York City, Rochdale and Hartlepool United were all re-elected, Southport and Wigan tied, and Bath City, the Southern League nomination, received the fewest votes and were eliminated. A revote took place to determine whether Southport or Wigan would be elected into the Football League. Wigan Athletic received 29 votes to Southport's 20, confirming that Wigan would replace Southport in the Fourth Division next season. It is believed that Wigan's strong performance in the FA Cup, where they reached the third round, earned them the support they needed to be elected into the Football League.

Match results

Legend

Friendlies

League

On 19 August 1978, Wigan Athletic played their first Football League game against Hereford United at Edgar Street, captained by the club's appearance record holder Ian Gillibrand. The match finished 0–0. Their first home League game was against Grimsby Town ended with a 3–0 defeat. Wigan were awarded a penalty with the scoreline at 2–0, but was missed by Ian Purdie. A defeat against Reading followed. On 2 September, in the club's fourth game of the season against Newport County, Joe Hinnigan became Wigan's first ever League goal scorer, but the team went on to lose the match 3–2. After losing 2–1 away at Wimbledon, the club's fourth consecutive defeat, Wigan found themselves at the bottom of the table. The club recorded its first League victory in the next match against Rochdale, winning the match 3–0 following the dismissal of Rochdale defender Bob Scott.

In October 1978, Wigan played a friendly against the Zambian national team, coached by former Latics manager Brian Tiler.

On 13 April 1979, Wigan came back to beat Port Vale 5–3 after being three goals down with 25 minutes remaining.

Source:

FA Cup

League Cup

As a newly promoted Football League club, Wigan Athletic were also entered into the League Cup for the first time in their history, and were drawn in the First round against Third Division side Tranmere Rovers. The first leg of the tie was played at Prenton Park, and was Wigan's first competitive fixture as a League club. The match finished 1–1, with Tommy Gore scoring a late equaliser with an effort from long range. Wigan progressed to the next round after winning the return leg 2–1. In the Second Round, Wigan played Luton Town of the Second Division at Kenilworth Road, but despite producing a strong performance they were ultimately defeated 2–0.

Final league table

Player statistics
Note: Numbers in brackets are appearances as a substitute.
Source:

Transfers

In

Out

Loans in

References
General

Wigan Athletic Football League players - A to Z
Wigan Athletic Results 1978 - 1979

Specific

Wigan Athletic F.C. seasons
Wigan Athletic F.C.